Halal Development Corporation Berhad, or HDC (formerly known as Halal Industry Development Corporation Sdn Bhd), is a Malaysian federal government agency mandated as the custodian of Malaysia's Halal economy, and featured as a trusted partner in the Halal business.  Its mission is to generate opportunities for the community of stakeholders within Malaysia's Halal ecosystem.

HDC was founded on September 18, 2006, as a pioneering government-backed organization that represents a purpose-built institution to consolidate the various industry clusters that make up Malaysia's Halal industry, playing a front-line role in enabling the country to further strengthen the depth of economic contribution from its Halal sector. Among the various approaches utilized, HDC engages in the design and implementation of various adapted programs catered to the broad needs of businesses ranging from Micro, Small and Medium Enterprises (MSME) to Large Multinational Corporations.  HDC also partners very closely with public sector organizations from the federal to state levels to support the advancement of Halal standards and commerce across the nation.

To date, HDC's joint efforts have been highlighted as a key driver in fulfilling the nation's target to position itself as a global Halal hub.  This is an objective echoed by HDC's vision statement which underscores its aim to build Malaysia as the most competitive country in the global Halal industry. To guide the successful systematic evolution of Malaysia's Halal industry, HDC is acknowledged for spearheading the development of the Halal Industry Masterplan 2008-2020 and more recently, the Halal Indusplan 2030.

With the popularity of Halal products and services growing rapidly across the globe, more public and private sector stakeholders from various nations are seeking expertise of the Halal industry from Malaysia.  Therefore, as of 2019, HDC has begun progressively expanding its services and partnerships in order to better cater to a surge in worldwide demand.  This includes strategic augmentation of HDC's footprint into various regions and nations including Japan, Korea, and Taiwan.

On the domestic front, HDC plays a crucial role as the secretariat of Malaysia's Halal Industry Development Council (MPIH) chaired by Malaysia's deputy prime minister.  In this seat, HDC is tasked as central coordinator to ensure the fulfillment of four key objectives;

 Formulate strategic policy and monitoring
 Certification enhancement and enforcement
 Standard development and traceability
 Industry development and Entrepreneurial Culture

Hairol Ariffein Sahari currently serves as the Acting Chief Executive Officer after the departure of previous CEO Dato Seri Jamil Bidin.  As of 30 July 2019, HDC appointed Dato' Mahmud Abbas as its chairman, replacing Datuk Seri Rizuan Abdul Hamid, who had succeeded HDC's founding chairman, Tan Sri Dr. Syed Jalaludin Syed Salim earlier.

Notable events

In October 2013, HDC signed a memorandum of understanding with SME Bank and Bumiputera Agenda Steering Unit for the establishment of a RM280 million Halal Development Fund. The fund is intended to the develop the halal industry and ready Bumiputera entrepreneurs in Malaysia for international markets.

In March 2019, HDC signed a Memorandum of Understanding (MoU) with the Korea-Trade Investment Promotion Agency with the overarching aspiration of enhancing bilateral trade and investment between both countries.

On October 7, HDC signed an MoU with Taiwan's Food Industry Research and Development Institute (FIRDI) to support the advancement of Taiwan's Halal Industry.

In Early February 2019, HDC announced a partnership with Acrosx Incorporated Japan to provide advisory, capacity building and technical assistance to strengthen the business landscape for Muslim-friendly products and services in Japan.

References

External links
 World Halal Conference
 Halal Knowledge Centre 
 Global Halal Support Centre
 Halal Park by HDC

2006 establishments in Malaysia
Government-owned companies of Malaysia
Ministry of International Trade and Industry (Malaysia)
Minister of Finance (Incorporated) (Malaysia)
Companies established in 2006
Privately held companies of Malaysia
Malaysian companies established in 2006